Khaemwaset or Khaemweset ("He who appears in Thebes") was a personal ancient Egyptian name popular during the New Kingdom. Some notable bearers were:

Khaemwaset (18th dynasty), prince and probably son of Amenhotep II
Khaemwaset (Nubian official) under Tutankhamun
Khaemwaset, the most famous of the Khaemwasets, prince and son of Ramesses II
Khaemwaset C, son of Merneptah and Isetnofret II
Khaemwaset (20th dynasty), prince and son of Ramesses III
Khaemwaset (Vizier), vizier under Ramesses IX

Ancient Egyptian given names